Kai Syväsalmi is a Finnish professional ice hockey defenceman who from 2007 played for KalPa of the SM-liiga.

References

External links

Living people
KalPa players
Finnish ice hockey defencemen
Year of birth missing (living people)